Hatching is an artistic technique for shading. It may also refer to:

 The crosshatch symbol or number sign
 Crossed letter, an overwritten document
 Hatching (heraldry), a system for depicting armory in monochrome

Film
The Hatching, a 2014 British black horror comedy film
Hatching (film), a 2022 Finnish horror film

See also
 Hatch (disambiguation)